Leirvatnet is a lake located on the border between Norway and Sweden.  The majority of the  lake lies in Sørfold Municipality in Nordland county, Norway, and the remaining  of the lake are located in Jokkmokk Municipality in Norrbotten County, Sweden.  The lake lies at one end of the large Blåmannsisen glacier.

See also
 List of lakes in Norway
 Geography of Norway

References

Sørfold
Lakes of Nordland
Lakes of Norrbotten County
Norway–Sweden border
International lakes of Europe